Natalie Buck (born 5 July 1980 in Sydney) is an Australian former ice dancer. She competed with Trent Nelson-Bond. They are the 2002–06 Australian national champions. They have competed five times at the World Figure Skating Championships and six times at the Four Continents Championships. Their highest placement was 12th at the 2004 and 2006 Four Continents. They retired from competitive skating following the 2005–06 Olympic season.

She used a special physical and psychological training program that former Olympian swimmer Semyon Belits-Geiman had developed for figure skaters.

Buck previously competed as a single skater at the national level.

Competitive highlights
(with Nelson-Bond)

References

External links
 
 Ice Dance.com profile

Australian female ice dancers
1980 births
Living people
Sportswomen from New South Wales
Figure skaters from Sydney